is one of three wards of Sagamihara, Kanagawa, Japan, located in the east part of the city. The west of Minami-ku faces Chūō-ku. 

Minami-ku was created on April 1, 2010 when Sagamihara became a city designated by government ordinance (a "designated city"). 

As of March 2010, Minami-ku had a population of 272,794, with a land area of 38.2 square kilometers.

Education
Municipal junior high schools:

 Asamizodai (麻溝台中学校)
 Kami Tsuruma (上鶴間中学校)
 Onodai (大野台中学校)
 Ono Minami (大野南中学校)
 Sagamidai (相模台中学校)
 Shincho (新町中学校)
 Sobudai (相武台中学校)
 Soyo (相陽中学校)
 Torin (東林中学校)
 Unomori (鵜野森中学校)
 Wakakusa (若草中学校)
 Yaguchi (谷口中学校)

Municipal elementary schools:

 Araiso (新磯小学校)
 Asamizo (麻溝小学校)
 Futaba (双葉小学校)
 Kami Tsuruma (上鶴間小学校)
 Kashimadai (鹿島台小学校)
 Kunugidai (くぬぎ台小学校)
 Midoridai (緑台小学校)
 Minami Ono (南大野小学校)
 Moegidai (もえぎ台小学校)
 Ono (大野小学校)
 Onodai (大野台小学校)
 Onodai Chuo (大野台中央小学校)
 Onuma (大沼小学校)
 Sagamidai (相模台小学校)
 Sakuradai (桜台小学校)
 Sobudai (相武台小学校)
 Torin (東林小学校)
 Tsurunodai (鶴の台小学校)
 Tsuruzono (鶴園小学校)
 Wakakusa (若草小学校)
 Wakamatsu (若松小学校)
 Yaguchi (谷口小学校)
 Yaguchidai (谷口台小学校)
 Yumenooka (夢の丘小学校)

References

Wards of Sagamihara